Progreso is a city in Mexicali Municipality, Baja California. Located in the Sonoran Desert, Progreso had a population of 12,557 as of 2010.

Progreso gives its name to one of the western delegations of the municipality.

References

Mexicali Municipality
Populated places in Baja California